James Southall Wilson (1880–1963) was an author, University of Virginia professor, and founder of the Virginia Quarterly Review. He organized the 1931 Southern Writers Conference. His wife, Julia Tyler, was the granddaughter of President John Tyler and a founder of Kappa Delta sorority. Wilson wrote the College of William & Mary's spirit song, "Our Alma Mater."

Wilson wrote a biography of ornithologist Alexander Wilson in 1906.

References

1880 births
1963 deaths
College of William & Mary alumni

Burials at the University of Virginia Cemetery
University of Virginia faculty